Isaac Benjamin Krentzman Jr. (March 21, 1914 – March 29, 1998) was a United States district judge of the United States District Court for the Middle District of Florida.

Education and career

Born in Milton, Florida, Krentzman received a Bachelor of Science degree from University of Florida in 1935. He received a Juris Doctor from Fredric G. Levin College of Law at the University of Florida in 1938. He was in private practice of law in Clearwater, Florida from 1938 to 1941 and 1946 to 1967. He was in the United States Army as a Lieutenant Colonel from 1941 to 1946. He was town attorney of Largo, Florida from 1946 to 1956. He was city attorney of Clearwater from 1949 to 1950 and from 1956 to 1958. He was special counsel for the Florida State Road Department from 1960 to 1963.

Federal judicial service

Krentzman was nominated by President Lyndon B. Johnson on May 24, 1967, to a seat on the United States District Court for the Middle District of Florida vacated by Judge John Milton Bryan Simpson. He was confirmed by the United States Senate on June 12, 1967, and received his commission the same day. He served as Chief Judge from 1981 to 1982. He assumed senior status on November 15, 1982. His service was terminated on March 29, 1998, due to his death in Clearwater.

References

Sources
 A biographical work by Morison Buck, Ben Krentzman (1914–1998): Gentle in spirit, resolute in robe in 2000.
 

University of Florida alumni
Judges of the United States District Court for the Middle District of Florida
United States district court judges appointed by Lyndon B. Johnson
20th-century American judges
1914 births
1998 deaths
20th-century American lawyers
People from Milton, Florida
Fredric G. Levin College of Law alumni